The 1992–93 League of Wales was the inaugural season of the League of Wales, the top division of Welsh football. The League was made up of 20 member clubs that joined from leagues within both the English football league system and Welsh football league system.

Overview

Background
The new league was formed for the 1992–93 season. At the time, Wales was unusual in world football in that despite the Football Association of Wales (FAW) being a FIFA member and, along with the other three home nations (England, Northern Ireland and Scotland), holding a permanent seat on the International Football Association Board (IFAB), it did not organise a national league. With African and Asian nations feeling that the FAW were taking advantage of this fact, FAW Secretary General, Alun Evans announced in October 1991 that the new league would start at the beginning of the next season.

There were cross-regional leagues, such as the Cymru Alliance and the Welsh Football League along with the long established National competition, in the form of the Welsh Cup. However it was always felt that organising a national league would prove too difficult, due to the poor transport links between the North and South, combined with the fact that the larger clubs tended to ply their trade in the English football league system. At the time, Cardiff City, Swansea City and Wrexham were playing in The Football League, with Newport County having been relegated at the end of the 1987–88 season. The FAW decided to allow the remaining Football League teams to continue to play in the English system. Of the non-league clubs: Bangor City, Barry Town, Caernarfon Town, Colwyn Bay, Merthyr Tydfil, Newport, Newtown and Rhyl, the FAW gave them the ultimatum of joining the Welsh football league system or continue to play in the English system and be forced to play home games on English soil.

The 'Irate Eight', as they were dubbed by the Welsh press, appealed against this decision arguing that they should continue to play where they wished. However, with the exception of Merthyr Tydfil who were playing in the Football Conference, they were all told that they must join the new league. Of the eight only Bangor City, Newtown and Rhyl decided to join the new league, although Rhyl's application was late meaning they were forced to play in the Cymru Alliance, with the remaining five, dubbed 'The Exiles', would continue to play in the English System. Barry Town, who changed their name to Barri while ground-sharing with Worcester City at St George's Lane, continued to play in the Southern Football League Midland Division along with Newport who were ground-sharing with Gloucester City. Caernarfon Town and Colwyn Bay continued to play in the Northern Premier League, with Caernarfon Town ground-sharing with Curzon Ashton at their Tameside Stadium and Colwyn Bay doing the same with Northwich Victoria at the Drill Field.

As the new league was to top the Welsh football league system, the FAW sought re-organise the Welsh football pyramid, by placing the League of Wales at the top of the pyramid with the largest regional divisions, the Cymru Alliance and the Welsh Football League, being placed below this as feeder leagues. With this in mind the FAW sought to invite clubs from these leagues to become members of the League of Wales. Of the two leagues eight clubs left the Cymru Alliance with ten clubs leaving the Welsh Football League.

League members

League table

Results

Top goalscorers

Source:

See also
 1992–93 in Welsh football

References

Cymru Premier seasons
1992–93 in Welsh football leagues
Wales